Gellertia is a monotypic genus of karyorelict ciliates in the family Geleiidae. It contains a single species, Gellertia heterotricha.

The genus is on average 400 µm long and 60 µm in width. It is characterized by a very simplified adoral infraciliature, reduced to a row of two dikinetids (whereas the genus Geleia shows long polykinetids).

The genus name is a taxonomic patronym honoring the protistologist József Gellért.

References 

Ciliate genera
Monotypic genera
Karyorelictea
Taxa described in 1999